Porta Nuova (literally "New Gate") is one of the two medieval gates of Milan that still exist in the modern city (together with the medieval Porta Ticinese). It is sited along the ancient "Navigli Ring" on the perimeter of the medieval walls of the city.
 
Originally built in the twelfth century, Porta Nuova was restored in the nineteenth century with the insertion of two lateral passages next to the two central arcs and the addition of some ancient Roman steles on the external facade of the gate.

The external facade, overlooking Cavour square (Piazza Cavour), preserve the original appearance with a marble shrine of the Madonna and Child with Saints.

See also
Walls of Milan

Gallery

Sources and links

Le città d'arte:Milano, Guide brevi Skira, ed.2008, autori vari. (Italian language edition)
Milano e Provincia, Touring club Italiano, ed.2003, autori vari.  (Italian language edition)
 Le lapidi di Porta Nuova, in AA.VV., La Porta Nuova delle mura medievali di Milano. Dai Novellii ad oggi venti secoli di storia milanese, a cura delle Civiche Raccolte Archeologiche e Numismatiche di Milano, Milano 1991, pp. 59–81. (Italian language paper)

Tourist attractions in Milan